Hercules Rowley (1679 – 19 September 1742) was an Anglo-Irish politician.

Early life
He was the only son of Sir John Rowley (who was knighted for his services at the time of the Restoration) and the former Mary Langford (eldest daughter and heiress of Sir Hercules Langford, 1st Baronet). Among his sisters were Lettice Rowley (wife of Arthur Loftus, 3rd Viscount Loftus), Anne Rowley (wife of Sir Tristram Beresford, 1st Baronet), and Mary Rowley (wife of James Clotworthy).

In 1661, his grandfather Hercules Langford bought Lynch's Castle (located on the Sumerhill demesne in County Meath) and many other townlands from The Rt Rev. Dr. Henry Jones, the Lord Bishop of Meath.

Career
Rowley was a Member of Parliament for Londonderry County in the Irish House of Commons between 1703 and his death in 1742. He was the uncle, by marriage, of the politician Henry Maxwell, with whom he clashed over proposals in 1721 to establish the Bank of Ireland.

Personal life
On 3 January 1705, Rowley was married to Frances Upton, the sixth daughter of Arthur Upton of Castle Upton in County Antrium. Together, they were the parents of:

 Dorothy Beresford Rowley, who married Richard Wingfield, 1st Viscount Powerscourt, the son of Edward Wingfield and Eleanor ( Gore) Wingfield (daughter of Sir Arthur Gore, 1st Baronet), in 1727. 
 Hercules Langford Rowley (–1794), who married Elizabeth Ormsby Upton, the only daughter of Clotworthy Upton (MP for the borough of Newton and County Antrim) and Jane Ormsby (daughter of John Ormsby MP for Kilmallock), in 1732.

Rowley died on 19 September 1742.

References

1679 births
1742 deaths
17th-century Anglo-Irish people
18th-century Anglo-Irish people
Irish MPs 1703–1713
Irish MPs 1715–1727
Irish MPs 1727–1760
Members of the Parliament of Ireland (pre-1801) for County Londonderry constituencies